A bombardment is an attack by artillery fire or by dropping bombs from aircraft on fortifications, combatants, or towns and buildings.

Prior to World War I, the term was only applied to the bombardment of defenseless or undefended objects, houses, public buildings, etc. It was only loosely employed to describe artillery attacks upon forts or fortified positions in preparation for assaults by infantry. Since then, it has come to mean any mass attack delivered by artillery or short-range tactical missiles, and later, aerial bombardment delivered by aircraft or long-range missiles.

History
In its old strict sense, the term was only applied to the bombardment of defenseless or undefended objects, houses, public buildings, etc., by an assailant with the object of disheartening his opponent, and specially to force the civilian population and authorities of a besieged place to persuade their military commander to capitulate before the actual defenses of the place have been reduced to impotence. The practice of employing artillery to achieve these ends was especially common up until World War I; since then long-range artillery bombardment has been joined by aerial bombardment delivered by aircraft or missiles.

Bombardment can only achieve its objective when the amount of suffering inflicted upon non-combatants is sufficient to break down their resolution, and when the commander permits himself to be influenced or coerced by the sufferers. A threat of bombardment will sometimes induce the target to surrender, but instances of its fulfillment being followed by success are rare; in general, with a determined commander, bombardments fail in their objective. Further, intentionally intense fire at a large target, unlike the slow, steady and minutely accurate artillery attacks directed upon the fortifications, requires the expenditure of large quantities of ammunition and wears out the guns of the attack. Bombardments are, however, frequently resorted to in order to test the temper of the garrison and the civilian population, a notable instance being the Siege of Strasbourg in 1870.

The term has evolved during the twentieth century to incorporate broader massed artillery attacks by one army against another, for example the front wide bombardment prior to the 1916 attack on the Somme or the massed bombardments preceding Operation Uranus during World War II.

References 

Artillery operation
Explosive weapons